Cybalomia gratiosalis is a moth in the family Crambidae. It was described by Hugo Theodor Christoph in 1887 and is found in Transcaucasia.

References

Cybalomiinae
Moths described in 1887